Paola Brumana (born 26 November 1982) is an Italian former football striker who played for several women's Serie A clubs and the Italy national team.

Club career
She has played for UPC Tavagnacco from 2006 until June 2018.

International career
Brumana made her senior debut for Italy on 13 November 2004, in a 3–2 friendly win over the Czech Republic. Not rated by national coach Pietro Ghedin, Brumana spent several years in the international wilderness before being recalled by Ghedin's successor Antonio Cabrini. She was selected by Cabrini to be part of the national team for UEFA Women's Euro 2013 in Sweden.

Honours

Club
Foroni Verona FC
 Women's Serie A: 2003–04

Bardolino Verona
 Women's Serie A: 2004–05
 Italian Women's Cup: 2005–06

UPC Tavagnacco
 Italian Women's Cup: 2012–13, 2013–14

References

External links
 
 
 Profile at fussballtransfers.com
 
 Profile at soccerdonna.de

1982 births
Living people
Italian women's footballers
Italy women's international footballers
Women's association football forwards
U.P.C. Tavagnacco players
A.S.D. AGSM Verona F.C. players
Sportspeople from Como
Footballers from Lombardy
S.S.D. F.C. Como Women players
Foroni Verona F.C. players